Balsfjord Church is a parish church of the Church of Norway in Balsfjord Municipality in Troms og Finnmark county, Norway. It is located at Balsfjord, just north of the village of Tennes. It is one of the churches for the Balsfjord parish which is part of the Senja prosti (deanery) in the Diocese of Nord-Hålogaland. The white, wooden church was built in a long church style in 1856 using plans drawn up by the architect Christian Heinrich Grosch. The church seats about 400 people.

Media gallery

See also
List of churches in Nord-Hålogaland

References

Balsfjord
Churches in Troms
Wooden churches in Norway
19th-century Church of Norway church buildings
Churches completed in 1856
1856 establishments in Norway
Long churches in Norway